Frontiers in Heat and Mass Transfer is a peer-reviewed open access scientific journal covering heat and mass transfer. It is published by Global Digital Central and the editors-in-chief are Amir Faghri (University of Connecticut) and Yuwen Zhang (University of Missouri). In 2017, Frontiers in Heat Pipes was merged into this journal.

Abstracting and indexing
The journal is abstracted and indexed in Emerging Sources Citation Index, Ei Compendex, and Scopus.

References

External links

Engineering journals
English-language journals
Publications established in 2010
Continuous journals